The Amos Gould House is a single-family home located at 115 West King Street in Owosso, Michigan. It was listed on the National Register of Historic Places in 1980.

History
Amos Gould settled in Owosso in 1843. In 1860 he constructed a house in the fashionable Oliver Street district. He may have constructed this kitchen and servants' quarters at the same time, or the structure may have been his original 1843 house. In 1873, Gould completely remodeled this own house by covering it with brick, but left the servants' quarters the same. The building was later moved to this location.

Description
The Amos Gould House is a balloon-framed structure covered with clapboard. It has symmetrical window placement and a hipped roof with a simple roofline, supported with elaborately carved brackets. These were likely added during the 1873 remodeling.

References

		
National Register of Historic Places in Shiawassee County, Michigan
Houses completed in 1860